Rafiq Ahmed Jamali (born 1 January 1967) is a Pakistani politician who has been a member of the National Assembly of Pakistan, since August 2018. Previously he was a member of the National Assembly from 2002 to May 2018. From November 2008 to February 2011, he served as Minister of State for Food and Agriculture.

Early life
He was born on 1 January 1967 to Sardar Muhammad Bux Jamali.

Political career

He ran for the seat of the National Assembly of Pakistan as an independent candidate from Constituency NA-178 (Dadu-II) in 1993 Pakistani general election but was unsuccessful. He received 18 votes and lost the seat to his father Muhammad Bux Jamali, a candidate of Pakistan Peoples Party (PPP).

Jamali was elected to the National Assembly as a candidate of PPP from Constituency NA-232 (Dadu-II) in 2002 Pakistani general election. He received 56,814 votes and defeated a candidate of Pakistan Muslim League (Q) (PML-Q).

He was re-elected to the National Assembly as a candidate of PPP from Constituency NA-232 (Dadu-II) in 2008 Pakistani general election. He received 87,467 votes and defeated a candidate of PML-Q. In November 2008, he was inducted into the federal cabinet of Prime Minister Yousaf Raza Gillani and was made Minister of State for Food and Agriculture. In September 2009, the Sindh High Court issued notice to the federal government to sack him from the office of Minister of State for Food and Agriculture. In December 2009, he was under consideration from getting removed from the federal cabinet due to his unsatisfactory performance. However he continued to serve as Minister of State for Food and Agriculture until February 2011.

He was re-elected to the National Assembly as a candidate of PPP from Constituency NA-232 (Dadu-II) in 2013 Pakistani general election. He received 76,876 votes and defeated a candidate of Pakistan Muslim League (N). He was accused of rigging the election using the state machinery, though election tribunal dismissed the accusations due to lack of evidence.

He was re-elected to the National Assembly as a candidate of PPP from Constituency NA-235 (Dadu-II) in 2018 Pakistani general election.

References

Pakistani MNAs 2013–2018
Pakistan People's Party politicians
Living people
1967 births
Pakistani MNAs 2002–2007
Pakistani MNAs 2008–2013
Pakistani MNAs 2018–2023
Sindhi people